Irena Homola-Skąpska (12 January 1929 – 4 March 2017, Kraków) was a Polish historian.

She graduated from the Jagiellonian University in 1951. In 1989, she was appointed professor. She collaborated with Polski Słownik Biograficzny since 1955.

Works
Mikołaj Zyblikiewicz (1823-1887) (1964)
"Kwiat społeczeństwa...": (struktura społeczna i zarys położenia inteligencji krakowskiej w latach 1860-1914) (1984)
Biografistyka w twórczości naukowej Stefana Kieniewicza (1993)
Józef Dietl i jego Kraków (1993)
Wspomnienie o Emanuelu Rostworowskim jako redaktorze Polskiego Słownika Biograficznego (1995)
W salonach i traktierniach Krakowa: przemiany w środowisku społecznym Krakowa lat 1795-1846 (2000)
34 articles in Polski Słownik Biograficzny

References

1929 births
2017 deaths
Polish women historians
Jagiellonian University alumni
Polish women academics
Place of birth missing
20th-century Polish historians
Academic staff of Jagiellonian University